is a 1938 Japanese comedy-drama film written and directed by Hiroshi Shimizu.

Plot
The movie opens with Toku and his fellow blind masseur friend Fuku walking down a mountain path, heading for a spa town where they have been hired to serve the guests. Toku develops an affection for a female customer who passed him on his way to the village and whom he recognises by her distinct Tokyo smell. The woman also awakens the interest of guest Shintarō, who arrived together with his little nephew. When a series of thefts occurs, Toku, believing that she is the culprit, wants to help her escape. Instead, he not only learns that she is innocent, but also that she is on the run from her patron whom she dislikes. The next day, she leaves the village in a carriage with a man, possibly her patron, witnessed by Toku and Shintarō and his nephew.

Cast
 Mieko Takamine as Michiho Misawa
 Shin Tokudaiji as Tokuichi
 Shinichi Himori as Fukuinchi Misawa
 Shin Saburi as Shintarō Omura	
 Bakudan Kozo as Kenichi
 Takeshi Sakamoto as Manager of the Kujira Inn	
 Zentaro Iijima as Kamekichi
 Hideko Kasuga as Okiku
 Chieko Kyotani (credited Chieko Kyoya) as Oaki
 Toru Hirose as Hiking student
 Akio Isono as Hiking student
 Toshiaki Konoe as Hiking student
 Fusako Maki as Hiking girl
 Mitsuko Miura as Hiking girl
 Ayuko Hirano as Hiking girl

Legacy
Film scholar Alexander Jacoby describes The Masseurs and a Woman as part of a group of three Shimizu films (together with Mr. Thank You  and Ornamental Hairpin) which "were bittersweet studies of grown-up feelings" and "group portraits set among temporary communities" that "concentrated more on the delineation of character than on plot". Distanced from social and political realities and with its largely personal concerns, it conformed, according to Jacoby, with the producing company Shochiku's tradition of Ōfuna flavor films (low-key domestic dramas, named after the location of the company's studios).

Home media
The Criterion Collection released the film in the US on DVD in 2009 as part of the Eclipse Series 15: "Travels with Hiroshi Shimizu".

References

External links
 
 
 
 

1938 films
1938 comedy films
1938 drama films
1938 comedy-drama films
Japanese comedy-drama films
1930s Japanese-language films
Japanese black-and-white films
Films directed by Hiroshi Shimizu
Films with screenplays by Hiroshi Shimizu
Films about blind people